Appert Lake National Wildlife Refuge is a National Wildlife Refuge in Emmons County, North Dakota.  It is a privately owned property with refuge easement rights for flooding, and is one of five easement refuges managed under Long Lake National Wildlife Refuge.  It is closed to hunting. It was established to provide a stable water area and safe haven for migrating waterfowl in response to declining populations during the Dust Bowl era of the 1930s. The refuge centers on a wooded prairie wetland which provides relatively unique habitat in an agriculturally dominated area. The refuge is used by wood ducks, American wigeon, green-winged teal, mallards, pintails, gadwalls and a host of woodland passerine bird species.

References

Refuge details
 Oh Ranger: Appert Lake NWR

External links
U.S. Geological Survey Map at the U.S. Geological Survey Map Website. Retrieved February 2, 2023.

Protected areas of Emmons County, North Dakota
National Wildlife Refuges in North Dakota
Easement refuges in North Dakota